Gmina Rejowiec is an urban-rural gmina (administrative district) in Chełm County, Lublin Voivodeship, in eastern Poland. It was formerly in Krasnystaw County, but was transferred to Chełm County in 2006.

Villages
Gmina Rejowiec contains the villages and settlements of Adamów, Aleksandria Krzywowolska, Aleksandria Niedziałowska, Bańkowszczyzna, Bieniów, Czechów Kąt, Elżbiecin, Hruszów, Kobyle, Leonów, Marynin, Marysin, Niedziałowice Drugie, Niedziałowice Pierwsze, Niemirów, Rejowiec, Rybie, Siedliszczki, Stary Majdan, Wereszcze Duże, Wereszcze Małe, Wólka Rejowiecka, Zagrody, Zawadówka and Zyngierówka.

Neighbouring gminas
Gmina Rejowiec is bordered by the town of Rejowiec Fabryczny and by the gminas of Chełm, Krasnystaw, Łopiennik Górny, Rejowiec Fabryczny and Siennica Różana.

References
Polish official population figures 2006

Gminas in Lublin Voivodeship
Chełm County